Legislative Assembly elections were held in Goa on 11 November 1989 to elect all 40 members of the Goa Legislative Assembly.

Results

Elected members

See also 
 Goa Legislative Assembly
 Elections in Goa

References 

Goa
1980s in Goa
State Assembly elections in Goa